The men's 400 metres event at the 2015 Asian Athletics Championships was held on the 3 and 4 of June.

Medalists

Results

Heats
First 2 in each heat (Q) and the next 2 fastest (q) qualified for the final.

Final

References

400
400 metres at the Asian Athletics Championships